Charles Graeber is an American journalist and author. He published two nonfiction books in the 2010s. He wrote the 2013 book The Good Nurse: A True Story of Medicine, Madness, and Murder about the serial killer Charles Cullen, which was a follow-up to his 2007 article for New York magazine about Cullen, and the 2018 book The Breakthrough: Immunotherapy and the Race to Cure Cancer about cancer immunotherapy.

Graeber was born in the US state of Iowa and lives in Nantucket, Massachusetts and Brooklyn, New York. Before becoming a journalist and author, he was a medical student and researcher and co-authored papers for scientific journals. As a journalist, Graeber has written for numerous publications, including Wired, GQ, The New Yorker, Outside, and The New York Times. The New York Timess Janet Maslin said Graeber "has been drawn to extremes throughout his reporting career", highlighting his Wired article about Kim Dotcom.

Graeber's book The Good Nurse was adapted into the 2022 drama film The Good Nurse, produced by Netflix. Graeber met with the film's writer Krysty Wilson-Cairns and provided access to the materials he used for his book. He is also one of the producers for the 2022 Netflix documentary Capturing the Killer Nurse  which began streaming on Netflix on November 11, 2022.

Bibliography
Noteworthy articles

Books

References

External links

Living people
American writers
American journalists
Journalists from Iowa
Writers from Iowa
Year of birth missing (living people)